is a railway station in Hyōgo Town, Saga City, Saga Prefecture, Japan. It is operated by JR Kyushu and is on the Nagasaki Main Line.

Lines

Station layout 
The station, which is unstaffed, consists of two side platforms serving two tracks. A small station building of simple concrete construction, serves as a waiting room and houses an automatic ticket vending machine. Access to the opposite side platform is by means of a footbridge.

Adjacent stations

History
Japanese Government Railways (JGR) opened the station on 1 December 1928 as an additional station on the existing track of the Nagasaki Main Line. With the privatization of Japanese National Railways (JNR), the successor of JGR, on 1 April 1987, control of the station passed to JR Kyushu.

Passenger statistics
In fiscal 2016, the daily average number of passengers using the station (boarding passengers only) was above 100 and below 323. The station did not rank among the top 300 busiest stations of JR Kyushu.

References

External links
Igaya Station (JR Kyushu)

Nagasaki Main Line
Railway stations in Saga Prefecture
Railway stations in Japan opened in 1928